In 1915, due to World War I food restrictions and rationing, the German bureaucracy decided to regard pigs as co-eaters with humans and tried to preserve supplies. As a result, five million pigs were massacred in the so-called Schweinemord (German: pig massacre) to both make food and preserve grain. However it did little to increase the supply of grain, as officials did not take into account the use of pig manure as fertilizer on small farms. Because of this, killing the pigs actually decreased crop yields in the region.

References 
Roger Chickering: Das Deutsche Reich und der Erste Weltkrieg, C.H.Beck, P. 57 Online
Cove, Dennis and Westwel, Ian ed. History of World War I:  the Home Fronts, Technologies of the War, P. 653 

German Empire in World War I
Rationing by country
Famines in Germany
1915 in Germany
Agriculture in Germany
Regulation in Germany
20th-century famines
1915 disasters in Germany